Mórahalom Városi Sportegylet is a professional football club based in Mórahalom, Csongrád County, Hungary, that competes in the Nemzeti Bajnokság III, the third tier of Hungarian football.

External links
 Profile on Magyar Futball

References

Football clubs in Hungary
Association football clubs established in 1936
1936 establishments in Hungary